The Ain is a river in eastern France. It gave its name to the Ain department.

Geography
The river rises at an altitude of some 700 metres, near the village of La Favière, in the Jurassic limestone of the southern end of the Jura mountains and flows into the Rhône near Saint-Maurice-de-Gourdans, about 40 kilometres upstream of Lyon.

Its source is in the old county of Franche-Comté. It flows south through the combined lengths of the two departments of:
 Jura (named after the mountains), and
 Ain (named after the river).

On the way it passes through the towns of Champagnole and Pont-d'Ain. Its longest tributaries are the Suran, Bienne, Albarine and Valouse.

Geology
The river flows through two regions. The Jura is, of course, Jurassic but it includes less clay than the Jurassic of England so Upper or Middle Jurassic means limestone of some sort, possibly marl (EB 13). The lower river passes over Holocene deposits from the river's own activity amongst rocks of the Middle or Upper Pleistocene (CG).

The Jura consists of limestone strata crushed into ridges between the forces of the spreading rift valley of the Saône and the Alps, the latter raised by a collision of the Italian tectonic plate with Europe. The highest ridge is the easternmost and the Ain flows southwards in the lowest valley, which lies towards the western side of the Jura. The westernmost ridge is again rather higher as the plain of the Saône valley is subducted below the Jurassic rocks (Dercourt). The whole has been glaciated but there is relatively little till remaining in the Jura.

The lower Ain flows on the plain where there is much Pleistocene material, much of it glacial till. However, the low scarp between the Pays de Dombes and the river is Miocene (CG).

Economy
The economy is not generally such as to provide riches. Neither is it one which used to require large towns as other than external markets in which to sell. The population is therefore dispersed. The exception to this is the town of Oyonnax, in the Ange valley which is parallel with the Ain. According to the legend, St Léger gave the monopoly of comb making to Oyonnax in 630. The traditional small products of the region, wood-turning, horn combs and trinkets led to the development of a specialism in the injection moulding, vacuum forming and so on of plastics, beginning with celluloid in 1880. The town's population in 1999 was 24,636 but it is the exception for the river basin (ext links).

Timber is the region's most obvious asset. Some was marketed down river and some converted into charcoal which permitted the rise of water-powered forges working iron from smelters in the Saône valley. There is also pasture producing cheese specialities. In the 20th century, the water power was diverted to the production of hydro-electricity, a fact which aided the early introduction of the plastics industry at Oyonnax. In this, the Ain is central.

This is an area of unusually high rainfall for France. But in the summer season, the weather is usually kind. The woodland walks, fishing, sailing and impressive scenery have permitted the development of the outdoor kind of tourism.

Fauna 
The Ain is very rich in fish, including trout, in particular Salmo trutta fario; grayling, especially the common grayling Thymallys thymallus; pike, perch, barbel, bream, carp, tench, roach, Eurasian minnow, chub and loach.

Numerous birds populate the river's banks: duck, egret, swans, heron, and snipe. Beavers are also present and construct numerous dams while wild boar and roe deer are found in the woods and forests bordering the stream. Otters have once more been seen since 2003, so demonstrating a general improvement in the quality of the waters.

Development
The river's natural surroundings remain relatively wild, and are the subject of an environmental scheme by the name of a SDAGE (Schéma Directeur d’Aménagement et de Gestion des Eaux), set up under a French law. Its aim is to conserve and make the best use of the whole hydrological system by viewing it as a unit. That involves reconciling the hydro-electric stations with the boating, fishing, swimming and perhaps water extraction in view of the tendency to industrial development on the reclaimed delta land at its confluence with the Rhone at its southern end.

Statistics

See also
 Lac de Conflans, a lake at the confluence of the Ain and Valouse Rivers

References

Carte géologique de la France à l'échelle du millionième 6th edn, (2003)  [CG]
Michelin France Tourist and Motoring Atlas (2002)  [Mich]
Bartholomew, J.G. The Times Survey Atlas of the World (1922) [Times]
Dercourt, J. Géologie et Géodynamique de La France Outre-mer et européenne 3rd edn. (2002)  [Dercourt]
Encyclopediædia Britannica (1960) [EB]
Fauna paragraph translated from the French Wikipedia article.

External links

The dairy component of the economy
Plastics valley
Small manufacturing

Archaeology
Upper Palaeolithic cave art

Learned paper
MAYET, L. y PISSOT, J. (1915): Abri sous roche préhistorique de La Colombière près Pocin (Ain). Faculté des Sciences de Lyon. Laboratoire de Géologie et Paléontologie. section d'Anthropologie et Paléontologie, Lyon. 193 pp.

Rivers of France
Rivers of Ain
Rivers of Jura (department)
Rivers of the Jura
Rivers of Auvergne-Rhône-Alpes